The 2006–07 Villanova Wildcats men's basketball team represented Villanova University in the 2006–07 college basketball season. Villanova was led by head coach Jay Wright. The Wildcats participated in the Big East Conference and played their home games at The Pavilion with some select home games at the Wachovia Center. They finished the season 22–11, 9–7 in Big East play. They received an at-large bid to the 2007 NCAA Division I men's basketball tournament, earning a 9 seed, where they lost to Kentucky in the first round.

Class of 2006 

|-
| colspan="7" style="padding-left:10px;" | Overall Recruiting Rankings:     Scout – 24     Rivals – 14      ESPN
|}

Roster

Coaching staff 
Jay Wright – Head Coach

Brett Gunning – Associate Head Coach

Patrick Chambers – Assistant Coach

Ed Pinckney – Assistant Coach

Schedule

References 

Villanova Wildcats
Villanova Wildcats men's basketball seasons
Villanova